The Union of European Democrats (UED) is a liberal political party in Poland. It is led by Elżbieta Bińczycka.

It was founded as a merger of Democratic Party – demokraci.pl and "European Democrats" in November 2016. It joined the parliamentary group of the Polish People's Party in 2018, and later participated in upcoming elections under the European Coalition and Polish Coalition. Ideologically, it supports principles of social liberalism and advocates for a more federal European Union.

History

Early history and formation 

During the extraordinary congress of the Democratic Party – demokraci.pl, its structures were merged with the "European Democrats" association, gathered around a four-member parliamentary group, and formally changed the name of the party to the "Union of European Democrats". Its first president became Elżbieta Bińczycka and Jacek Protasiewicz was elected as vice-president. Former president of Poland Lech Wałęsa and the chairman of the Committee for the Defence of Democracy Mateusz Kijowski spoke at the party's founding conference, and letters were read from former presidents Bronisław Komorowski and Aleksander Kwaśniewski.

Elections period (2016–2019) 
In January 2018, Michał Kamiński, a prominent member inside UED, joined the parliamentary club led by the Polish People's Party. Soon after, they established a joint parliamentary club with Jacek Protasiewicz as vice-president, while Kamiński was chosen to be a part of the presidium. Protasiewicz later left to join Modern. During the 2018 local elections, UED participated with various parties.

Shortly before the 2019 European Parliament election, it joined the European Coalition which was established by the Civic Platform, Democratic Left Alliance, and Polish People's Party. UED's candidate was Elżbieta Bińczycka and she obtained 6,540 votes but no seats.

During June and July 2019, UED held discussions about joining the Polish Coalition, after which it joined. During the 2019 parliamentary election, UED obtained 29,832 votes and Jacek Protasiewicz was elected as its MP.

Modern period  (2020–present) 
During the 2020 presidential election, it supported Władysław Kosiniak-Kamysz as candidate of the Polish Coalition. In the second round, UED voiced its support for Rafał Trzaskowski.

Ideology and program
The Union of European Democrats is largely a liberal and social-liberal party that is positioned in the centre on the political spectrum. It advocates for the federalisation of the European Union.

Program 
The party program declaration is concerned with the defense of Polish democracy, support for Poland's membership of the European Union and NATO, and the putative threats to Poland posed by Russia. The UED supports the creation of a federal Europe. The party also advocates civil service reform, the separation of church and state, and the introduction of civil partnerships.

References

2016 establishments in Poland
Centrist parties in Poland
Liberal parties in Poland
Political parties established in 2016
Political parties in Poland
Pro-European political parties in Poland